The 2021 Coupe de France final was a football match between Monaco and Paris Saint-Germain to decide the winner of the 2020–21 Coupe de France, the 104th season of the Coupe de France. It took place on 19 May at the Stade de France in Saint-Denis, Paris.

Paris Saint-Germain won the final 2–0 for their record fourteenth Coupe de France title.

Background
Monaco reached the final this year for the tenth time in its history, and the first since 2010, a game they lost to Paris Saint-Germain as well.

Paris Saint-Germain were the defending champions, having won the 2020 final over Saint-Étienne 1–0 for their thirteenth title.

Route to the final

''Note: H = home fixture, A = away fixture

Match

Details

Notes

References

2021
Coupe De France Final 2021
Coupe De France Final 2021
Coupe De France Final 2021
Coupe De France Final
Coupe De France Final
Coupe De France Final